Juri, JURI or Jüri may refer to:

Law
 Dative singular case of Latin Jus
Committee on Legal Affairs, committee of the European Parliament, known as JURI

Places
Juri Upazila, subdistrict (upazila) in Maulvibazar District, Sylhet Division, Bangladesh
Jüri, settlement in Rae Parish, Harju County, Estonia
Juri, Razavi Khorasan (جوري), a village in Razavi Khorasan Province, Iran

People

Given name
Jüri (given name), an Estonian masculine given name
variant romanization of Yury (George)
Juri De Marco (born 1979), Italian football goalkeeper
Juri Judt (born 1986), German footballer
Juri Kurakin (born 1987), Estonian ice dancer
Juri Schlünz (born 1961), German football player and coach
Juri Toppan (born 1990), Italian footballer
樹里, a feminine Japanese name
, Japanese triathlete
Juri Manase (born 1975), Japanese actress
Juri Misaki (born 1980), Japanese manga artist
Juri Osada, Japanese figure skater
Juri Ueno (born 1986), Japanese actress
Juri Yokoyama (born 1955), Japanese volleyball player
Juri Takahashi (born 1997), Japanese singer

Surname
Aurelio Juri (born 1949), Slovenian politician
Carla Juri (born 1985), Swiss actress
Sakiho Juri (born 1971), Japanese actor

Fictional characters
Juri (Street Fighter), a South Korean taekwondo fighter in the Street Fighter video game series
Juri Nijou, a member of the United Air Force in Chouriki Sentai Ohranger
Juri Arisugawa (Revolutionary Girl Utena) a member of the school council, also becomes a duelist later on in the series

See also
Yuri (disambiguation)

Japanese feminine given names